Mauritz Gisiko (1794 - 1863) was a Swedish pianist and music educator. His notable students included Laura Netzel.

References

1794 births
1863 deaths
Swedish classical pianists
Male classical pianists
Swedish music educators
19th-century classical pianists
19th-century male musicians